Waiting staff (British English), waitstaff (North American English), waiters (male) / waitresses (female), or servers (North American English),, are those who work at a restaurant, a diner, or a bar and sometimes in private homes, attending to customers by supplying them with food and drink as requested. Waiting staff follow rules and guidelines determined by the manager. Waiting staff carry out many different tasks, such as taking orders, food-running, polishing dishes and silverware, helping bus tables and restocking working stations with needed supplies.

A waiter is also a person who waits.

Waiting on tables is part of the service sector and among the most common occupations in the United States. The Bureau of Labor Statistics estimates that, as of May 2008, there were over 2.2 million people employed as servers in the U.S.

Many restaurants choose a specific uniform for their waiting staff to wear. Waiting staff may receive tips as a minor or major part of their earnings, with customs varying widely from country to country.

Terminology
An individual waiting tables (or waiting on or waiting at tables) or waitering or waitressing is commonly called a waiter, server, front server, waitress, member of the wait staff, waitstaff, serving staff server, waitperson, or waitron. The last two terms are gender neutral but rarely used, and the terms waiter and server are increasingly used for women too. Archaic terms such as serving girl, serving wench, or serving lad are generally used only within their historical context.

Roles
In large luxury establishments, there are often multiple ranks of waiting staff in the dining room:
 Maître d'hôtel, responsible for dining room as a whole, greets guests; sometimes acts as headwaiter and/or supervisor
 Floor manager
 Expeditor, or "Expo", responsible for ensuring accuracy and completeness of orders. The expeditor is also often responsible for preparing the tray for the servers so they can bring all of the plates of that course to all of the table guests at the same time
 Captain, responsible for several tables
 Waiter
 Front waiter
 Back waiter, who helps waiters refill water, replenish bread, etc.
 Bar back, who helps a bartender by bussing, and restocking glassware and alcohol
 Runner, who brings cooked dishes to diners
 Busboy, busser, clears tables, sets tables
In such restaurants, the captain is typically responsible for interacting with the diners and overseeing waiters.

There are also specialists, notably a sommelier for wine service, and occasionally a maître fromager for the cheese service. A host or hostess may be responsible for seating diners if there is not a maître d'hôtel.

Duties

The duties of waiting staff can be tedious and harsh but are vital to the economic success of restaurants. Such duties include the following: preparing a section of tables before guests sit down (e.g., changing the tablecloth, putting out new utensils, cleaning chairs, etc.); offering cocktails, specialty drinks, wine, beer, or other beverages; recommending food options; requesting the chef to make changes in how food is prepared; pre-clearing the tables; and serving food and beverages to customers. In some higher-end restaurants, servers have a good knowledge of the wine list and can recommend food–wine pairings. At more expensive restaurants, servers memorize the ingredients of the dishes and the manner in which the food is prepared; for example, if the menu lists marinated beef, the customer might ask what the beef is marinated in, for how long, and what cut of beef is used in the dish. Silver service staff are specially trained to serve at banquets or high-end restaurants. These servers follow specific rules and service guidelines, which makes this a skilled job. They generally wear black and white with a long, white apron (extending from the waist to the ankles). At expensive restaurants, waiting staff also keep blacklists of rude customers. Some waiting staff, are trained to deal with aggressive customers and how to restrain them, until security or police arrive. Also they are trained at first aid, specifically the Silver service staff.

The head server is in charge of the waiting staff and is also frequently responsible for assigning seating. The head server must insure that all staff do their duties accordingly. The functions of a head server can overlap to some degree with that of the maître d'hôtel. Restaurants in North America employ an additional level of waiting staff, known as busboys or busgirls, increasingly referred to as bussers or server assistants, to clear dirty dishes, set tables, and otherwise assist the waiting staff.

Emotional labour is often required of waiting staff, particularly at many high-class restaurants.

Requirements

Restaurant serving positions require on-the-job training that would be held by an upper-level server in the restaurant. The server will be trained to provide good customer service, learn food items and drinks, and maintain a neat and tidy appearance. Working in a role such as captain in a top rated restaurant requires disciplined role-playing comparable to a theater performance.

In the United States, some states require individuals employed to handle food and beverages to obtain a food handler's card or permit. In those states, servers that do not have a permit or handler's card can not serve. The server can achieve a permit or handler's card online.

No food certification requirements are needed in Canada. However, to serve alcoholic beverages in Canada, servers must undergo their province's online training course within a month of being hired.

Job benefits
Waiting offers flexible work schedules and the ability to work on a part-time basis. This makes the profession appealing to students, parents with childcare commitments, and people who also work other jobs.

Most restaurants also provide their employees with free or discounted meals. High-end restaurants that have only one dinner meal service often provide a shared staff meal prepared by one of the chefs. The chef may also provide samples of special or new menu preparations so the waiting staff can experience the dish and be better able to describe it for the patron. Other restaurants that have multiple shifts will give an employee a meal for free or at a discount.

In the United States, which does not have universal health care, some restaurants offer health insurance to staff who are employed full-time.

Tipping in the United States
Different countries maintain different customs regarding tipping, but in the United States, a tip paid in addition to the amount presented on the bill for food and drinks is customary. At most sit-down restaurants, servers and bartenders expect a tip after a patron has paid the check. The minimum legally-required hourly wage paid to waiters and waitresses in many U.S. states is lower than the minimum wage employers are required to pay for most other forms of labor to account for the tips, which form a significant portion of the server's income. If wages and tips do not equal the federal minimum wage of $7.25 per hour during any week, the employer is required to increase cash wages to compensate for the difference.

Tips average between 15% and 20% of the bill, with 20% expected for good service, more than 20% expected for great service. Some patrons tip even more for exceptional service. If the server goes above and beyond to ensure the patron enjoys his meal, it is customary to give a higher tip. Some restaurants charge an automatic gratuity for larger parties (usually 6 or more), and the gratuity ranges from 15% to 20% depending on the restaurant. The amount that an establishment requires the customer to pay is a service charge.  Service charges, also known as automatic gratuities, are automatically included in the check. Common examples of service charges may include  banquet event fees, hotel fees, bottle service fees, and cruise ship fees.

See also
 Chamberlain (office)
 Hospitality
 Soda jerk
 Table service
 Waiters' Race
 Flight attendant

References

External links

 USA Today article on wait staff treatment
 Why is service still so bad in the UK?

 
Food services occupations
Articles containing video clips